Himalaya: Ladder to Paradise is a 2015 Chinese documentary film directed by Han Xiao and Junjian Liang. The film was released on October 16, 2015.

Cast
Suo Langduoji
Pu Budunzhu
Ge Sangyingzong
Ci Renduobujie
Jia Bu

Reception
The film has earned  at the Chinese box office.

References

Films set in the Himalayas
2015 documentary films
Chinese documentary films
Films about Tibet